Club Baloncesto Caja Bilbao was a professional basketball club based in Bilbao, Spain.

History
Caja Bilbao was founded in 1983 and promoted to Liga ACB in 1987, where it remained during five years.

It was dissolved in 1994 after promoting again to Liga ACB, but had not enough supporting to play the league.

Season by season

Notable players
 Juan Manuel López Iturriaga
 Joe Kopicki
 Darrell Lockhart

References

External links
Profile at Eskudoteka

Defunct basketball teams in Spain
Former Liga ACB teams
Basketball teams established in 1983
Basque basketball teams
Sports teams in Bilbao